The Way We Talk is the second EP by Tempe, Arizona-based rock band The Maine. It was released on December 11, 2007 via Fearless Records and sold 50,000 copies. "The Way We Talk" is the only single released from the EP.

Critical reception

Carlos Ramirez of AltSounds praised songs like "Give Me Anything" and "If I Only Had the Heart" calling them an "infectious attack." He ends off by stating, "if you are a fan of Cartel, Cute Is What We Aim For and Sherwood, The Way We Talk might just be your favorite new record."

Track listing
All lyrics written by John O'Callaghan and Jared Monaco, all music composed by The Maine.

iTunes bonus track

Personnel
Credits for The Way We Talk adapted from AllMusic.
The Maine
 John O'Callaghan - lead vocals, piano 
 Jared Monaco  - lead guitar
 Kennedy Brock - rhythm guitar, backing vocals 
 Garrett Nickelsen - bass
 Patrick Kirch - drums, percussion

Production
 Matt Grabe - engineer, instrumentation, mixing, producer, programming
 Brad Vance - mastering

Charts

References

External links

The Way We Talk EP at YouTube (streamed copy where licensed)

The Maine (band) EPs
2007 EPs